Abdul Rehman (born 2 January 1987) is a former cricketer who played for the United Arab Emirates national cricket team who played for the national team between 2004 and 2011.

A wicketkeeper and useful lower-order right-handed batsman, Rehman was plucked from the obscurity of the United Arab Emirates Under 17s squad into the national team for the 2004 Asia Cup.

He made his One Day International debut for the UAE against a strong Indian team but was not selected in the team for the next game against tournament hosts Sri Lanka.

His last international game came against Afghanistan in an ICC Intercontinental Cup game in October 2011.

References 

1987 births
Living people
Emirati cricketers
United Arab Emirates One Day International cricketers
People from the Emirate of Ajman
Pakistani expatriate sportspeople in the United Arab Emirates
Wicket-keepers